Dr. Tariq Aziz (Urdu: طارق عزیز born 5 February 1938) is a Pakistani former field hockey player. He won a Gold medal at the 1968 Summer Olympics in Mexico City, and a Silver medal at the 1964 Summer Olympics in Tokyo. Aziz was born in Amritsar, British India.

Education
Aziz graduated from CVS, Lahore, Pakistan in 1959 and did his masters (M.Sc) from the University of Agriculture (Faisalabad) in 1966.

Career
He joined the University of Agriculture (Faisalabad), as instructor in 1962 and retired as professor of Veterinary Medicine in 1997.

Awards and recognition
 Pride of Performance Award for Sports by the President of Pakistan in 1968.

References

External links

1938 births
Living people
Field hockey players from Amritsar
Pakistani male field hockey players
Olympic field hockey players of Pakistan
Olympic gold medalists for Pakistan
Olympic silver medalists for Pakistan
Olympic medalists in field hockey
Medalists at the 1964 Summer Olympics
Medalists at the 1968 Summer Olympics
Field hockey players at the 1968 Summer Olympics
Field hockey players at the 1964 Summer Olympics
Asian Games medalists in field hockey
Field hockey players at the 1962 Asian Games
Field hockey players at the 1966 Asian Games
Asian Games gold medalists for Pakistan
Asian Games silver medalists for Pakistan
Medalists at the 1962 Asian Games
Medalists at the 1966 Asian Games
University of Agriculture, Faisalabad alumni